Reverse leakage current in a semiconductor device is the current from that semiconductor device when the device is reverse biased. 

When a semiconductor device is reverse biased it should not conduct any current, however, due to an increased barrier potential, the free electrons on the p side are dragged to the battery's positive terminal, while holes on the n side are dragged to the battery's negative terminal.
This produces a current of minority charge carriers and hence its magnitude is extremely small.
For constant temperatures, the reverse current is almost constant although the applied reverse voltage is increased up to a certain limit. Hence, it is also called reverse saturation current.

The term is particularly applicable to mostly semiconductor junctions, especially diodes and thyristors.

Reverse leakage current is also known as "zero gate voltage drain current" with MOSFETs. The leakage current increased with temperature. As an example, the Fairchild Semiconductor FDV303N has a reverse leakage of up to 1 microamp at room temperature rising to 10 microamps with a junction temperature of 50 degrees Celsius.
For all basic purposes, leakage currents are very small, and, thus, are normally negligible.

Semiconductors